Culture Clash is the second studio album by The Aristocrats, released on July 16, 2013. Alongside a standard CD edition, there was also a deluxe edition available, with a bonus DVD called Accept the Mystery: The Making of The Aristocrats' "Culture Clash", including studio footage and interviews. In its first week of release, the album reached number 8 on the Billboard Contemporary Jazz albums chart and number 16 on the Jazz Albums chart. On September 24, 2013, a double vinyl edition was released, pressing limited to 1,000 copies.

Track listing

Personnel
Guthrie Govan - guitar
Bryan Beller - bass
Marco Minnemann - drums

References

2013 albums
The Aristocrats (band) albums